Euphorbia subg. Poinsettia is a subgenus deriving from the genus Euphorbia, and is endemic to North America. It contains around 24 species, of which the best known is E. pulcherrima, the poinsettia.

This species grows wild in the mountains on the Pacific slope of Mexico, and despite many legends, no one is quite sure from which wild populations the cultivated varieties derive.

This taxon was first published at genus rank under the name Poinsettia by Robert Graham in 1836. It was demoted to a section of Euphorbia as E. sect. Poinsettia by Henri Ernest Baillon in 1858, but promoted to subgenus rank by Homer Doliver House in 1924. Recent studies have confirmed its monophyly.

Its many species include:
 E. pulcherrima -- (poinsettia)
 E. cyathophora -- (summer poinsettia, wild poinsettia, painted leaf poinsettia)
 E. dentata -- (green poinsettia)
 E. heterophylla -- (desert poinsettia, wild poinsettia)
 E. pinetorum -- (Everglades poinsettia)
The common name "wild poinsettia" is sometimes applied to two of these species.

References

Poinsettia
Plant subgenera

fr:Poinsettia